Rawinia Everitt (born 4 September 1986 in Auckland) is a New Zealand rugby union and netball player. Everitt played netball in the ANZ Championship for the Northern Mystics from 2008 to 2009.

Rugby union career
She was called into the Black Ferns squad to tour England in 2011. Everitt was also included in the 2014 Women's Rugby World Cup squad. She was named in the 2017 Women's Rugby World Cup squad.

References

External links

2009 ANZ Championship profile. Retrieved 31 May 2009.
Black Ferns Profile

New Zealand netball players
Northern Mystics players
New Zealand Māori sportspeople
1986 births
Living people
New Zealand women's international rugby union players
New Zealand female rugby union players
Rugby union locks
Counties Manukau rugby union players